Everybody may refer to:

Music

Albums
Everybody (Chris Janson album) or the title song, 2017
Everybody (Gods Child album), 1994
Everybody (Hear'Say album), 2001
Everybody (Ingrid Michaelson album) or the title song, 2009
Everybody (Logic album) or the title song (see below), 2017
Everybody (The Sea and Cake album), 2007
Everybody (EP), by Shinee, or the title song (see below), 2013

Songs
"Everybody" (DJ BoBo song), 1994
"Everybody" (Justice Crew song), 2013
"Everybody" (Logic song), 2017
"Everybody" (Keith Urban song), 2007
"Everybody" (Kinky song), 1996
"Everybody" (Hear'Say song), 2001
"Everybody" (Madonna song), 1982
"Everybody" (Martin Solveig song), 2005
"Everybody" (Rudenko song), 2009
"Everybody" (Shinee song), 2013
"Everybody" (Stabilo song), 2001
"Everybody" (Tanel Padar and Dave Benton song), representing Estonia at Eurovision 2001
"Everybody" (Tommy Roe song), 1963
"Everybody (Backstreet's Back)", by Backstreet Boys, 1997
"Everybody", by Britney Spears from Blackout, 2007
"Everybody", by Ghastly from The Mystifying Oracle, 2018
"Everybody", by the Jacksons from Triumph, 1980
"Everybody", by Mac Miller from Circles, 2020
"Everybody", by Nicole Scherzinger from Killer Love, 2011

Other uses
Everybody (play), a 2017 play by Branden Jacobs-Jenkins updating the medieval morality play Everyman
Everybody (political party), a Chilean political party

See also

Everyone (disambiguation)
Indefinite pronoun